New Zealand competed at the 2004 Summer Olympics in Athens, Greece, from 13 to 29 August 2004. This was the nation's twenty-second appearance at the Olympics since its debut in 1908 as part of Australasia. The New Zealand Olympic Committee sent a total of 148 athletes, 81 men, and 67 women to the Games to compete in 18 sports, surpassing a single athlete short of the record from Sydney four years earlier. Basketball and field hockey were the only team-based sports in which New Zealand had its representation at these Olympic Games. There was only a single competitor in archery, boxing, and fencing.

Thirty-four athletes from the New Zealand team had previously competed in Sydney, including Olympic bronze medallist Barbara Kendall in women's Mistral windsurfing, equestrian eventing rider Blyth Tait, sprint kayaker and former breaststroke swimmer Steven Ferguson, table tennis sisters Chunli and Karen Li, and discus thrower Beatrice Faumuina, who was appointed by the committee to carry the New Zealand flag in the opening ceremony. Tait's compatriot Andrew Nicholson participated in his fifth Olympic appearance since the 1984 Summer Olympics in Los Angeles (except 2000, in which he was not chosen), as the most experienced athlete. While Tait shared the same age with Nicholson at 43, and served as the oldest member of the team by a month difference, breaststroke swimmer Annabelle Carey, aged 15, was the youngest ever New Zealand athlete to compete at the Olympics since 1976.

New Zealand left Athens with a total of five Olympic medals, three golds and two silver, finishing twenty-fourth in the overall medal count. Four New Zealand athletes won Olympic gold medals for the first time in history: Hamish Carter in men's triathlon, 
track cyclist Sarah Ulmer in women's individual pursuit, and twin sisters and rowers Caroline and Georgina Evers-Swindell in women's double sculls. (In other games, notably Los Angeles 1984, more than 4 New Zealand athletes won Gold Medals.)

Medallists

Archery

One New Zealand archer qualified for the men's individual archery through the 2004 Open New Zealand Championships.

Athletics

New Zealand athletes have so far achieved qualifying standards in the following athletics events (up to a maximum of 3 athletes in each event at the 'A' Standard, and 1 at the 'B' Standard).

Men
Track & road events

Field events

Women
Track & road events

Field events

Key
Note–Ranks given for track events are within the athlete's heat only
Q = Qualified for the next round
q = Qualified for the next round as a fastest loser or, in field events, by position without achieving the qualifying target
NR = National record
N/A = Round not applicable for the event
Bye = Athlete not required to compete in round

Badminton

New Zealand nominated a spot in the mixed doubles.

Basketball

Men's tournament

Roster

Group play

Classification match (9th–10th place)

Women's tournament

Roster

Group play

Quarterfinals

Classification match (7th–8th place)

Boxing

New Zealand sent a single boxer to Athens.

Canoeing

Sprint

Qualification Legend: Q = Qualify to final; q = Qualify to semifinal

Cycling

Road
Men

Women

Track
Pursuit

Omnium

Mountain biking

Equestrian

Dressage

Eventing

"#" indicates that the score of this rider does not count in the team competition, since only the best three results of a team are counted.

Show jumping

Fencing

Women

Field hockey

New Zealand qualified a men's and a women's team.  Each team had 16 athletes with two reserves.

Men's tournament

Roster

Group play

5th–8th place semifinal

5th place final

Women's tournament

Roster

Group play

5th–8th place semifinal

5th place final

Judo

Rowing

New Zealand rowers qualified the following boats:

Men

Women

Qualification Legend: FA=Final A (medal); FB=Final B (non-medal); FC=Final C (non-medal); FD=Final D (non-medal); FE=Final E (non-medal); FF=Final F (non-medal); SA/B=Semifinals A/B; SC/D=Semifinals C/D; SE/F=Semifinals E/F; R=Repechage

Sailing

New Zealand sailors have qualified one boat for each of the following events.

Men

Women

Open

M = Medal race; OCS = On course side of the starting line; DSQ = Disqualified; DNF = Did not finish; DNS= Did not start; RDG = Redress given

Shooting

Two New Zealand shooters (one man and one woman) qualified to compete in the following events:

Men

Women

Swimming

New Zealand swimmers earned qualifying standards in the following events (up to a maximum of 2 swimmers in each event at the A-standard time, and 1 at the B-standard time):

Men

Women

Table tennis

Two New Zealand table tennis players qualified for the following events.

Taekwondo

New Zealand has qualified a single taekwondo jin.

Triathlon

Three New Zealand triathletes qualified for the following events.

See also
 New Zealand at the 2002 Commonwealth Games
 New Zealand at the 2004 Summer Paralympics

References

External links
Official Report of the XXVIII Olympiad
New Zealand Olympic Team

Nations at the 2004 Summer Olympics
2004
Summer Olympics